Saint-Pierre-les-Bois is a commune in the Cher department in the Centre-Val de Loire region of France.

Geography
The river Arnon forms a small part of the commune’s northern border.

Population

Sights
 The church of St. Pierre, dating from the twelfth century (historic monument).
 Two eighteenth-century houses.

See also
Communes of the Cher department

References

External links

Annuaire Mairie website 

Communes of Cher (department)